The men's 4 × 100 metres relay event at the 1974 British Commonwealth Games was held on 31 January and 2 February at the Queen Elizabeth II Park in Christchurch, New Zealand.

Medalists

Results

Heats
Qualification: First 3 teams of each heat (Q) plus the next 2 fastest (q) qualified for the final.

Note: The newspaper report mentions Nigeria and Ghana for both heats and does not mention England or Scotland

Final

References

Heats results (The Canberra Times)

Athletics at the 1974 British Commonwealth Games
1974